The PASOK – Movement for Change (PASOK-KINAL; , ΚΙΝΑΛ) is a political party and former political alliance in Greece, founded in March 2018, initially as "Movement for Change" (Kínima Allagís), and is mainly affiliated with the centre-left of the political spectrum. It includes the Panhellenic Socialist Movement (PASOK) and Movement of Democratic Socialists (KIDISO), and formerly included The River and Democratic Left (DIMAR).

History
In July 2017, PASOK leader Fofi Gennimata announced the formation of a new unified centre-left party in Greece before the end of the year. In the summer of 2017, Stavros Theodorakis, leader and founder of The River also decided to participate in the creation of the party. After the leadership election, both PASOK–DIMAR and The River planned to continue with separate parliamentary groups until the new party's founding congress, scheduled for spring 2018. On 12 November 2017, the first round of leadership elections was held to select the new party's founding leader. Nine initial leadership candidates included Gennimata, Theodorakis, Athens mayor Giorgos Kaminis, PASOK MEP Nikos Androulakis, EDEM party leader Apostolos Pontas, academic Constantinos Gatsios, former PASOK ministers Yiannis Maniatis and Yiannis Ragousis, and Dimitris Tziotis. The candidates reaching the second-round election were Gennimata, with 44.5% of the vote, and Androulakis, with 25.4%. The run-off on 19 November was won by Gennimata, who garnered 56% of the vote. On 28 November 2017, “Movement for Change” (Kinima Allagis) was announced as the preliminary name of the party. On 2 December 2017, the party's six-member ruling council was announced, being composed of Gennimata, Theodorakis, Androulakis, Kaminis, DIMAR leader Thanasis Theocharopoulos and former PASOK Prime Minister George Papandreou.

The party held its founding congress on 16–18 March in Athens. During the congress, the new logo was unveiled and the party's charter and policy program was approved by the overwhelming majority of members.

On 2 July 2018, The River left KINAL. On 20 January 2019, DIMAR also left KINAL due to its position of supporting the Prespa agreement. On 1 June 2019 former PASOK leader Evangelos Venizelos left KINAL, accusing Gennimata of turning the Movement into "SYRIZA's tail".

KINAL increased its obtained seats in the 2019 Greek legislative election compared to Democratic Alignment, becoming Greece's third-largest party or coalition and securing 22 seats in the Hellenic Parliament. Following the election, KINAL positioned itself into opposition to the new Mitsotakis Government.

Gennimata died on 25 October 2021 at the Evangelismos Hospital in Athens from cancer.

Elections for the new leader took place in December 2021, with the main candidates being Andreas Loverdos, Nikos Androulakis, and George Papandreou.  Nikos Androulakis was elected to lead the KINAL and PASOK on 12 December 2021.

On 9 May 2022 the alliance was rebranded "PASOK – Movement for Change" (PASOK-KINAL) and became a political party that absorbed the original party incarnation, restoring the old PASOK symbol (the green sun) soon after that.

Composition 
Before becoming a political party, The alliance was composed by the following parties:

Until 2019, the alliance also included the following parties:

Election Results

Hellenic Parliament

European Parliament

References

2010s in Greek politics
2018 establishments in Greece
Political parties established in 2018
Social democratic parties in Greece
Party of European Socialists member parties
Full member parties of the Socialist International
Progressive Alliance
Pro-European political parties in Greece